Ozicrypta is a genus of Australian brushed trapdoor spiders first described by Robert Raven in 1994.

Species
 it contains twenty-five species:
Ozicrypta australoborealis Raven & Churchill, 1994 – Australia (Northern Territory)
Ozicrypta clarki Raven & Churchill, 1994 – Australia (Queensland)
Ozicrypta clyneae Raven & Churchill, 1994 – Australia (Queensland)
Ozicrypta combeni Raven & Churchill, 1994 – Australia (Queensland)
Ozicrypta cooloola Raven & Churchill, 1994 (type) – Australia (Queensland)
Ozicrypta digglesi Raven & Churchill, 1994 – Australia (Queensland)
Ozicrypta etna Raven & Churchill, 1994 – Australia (Queensland)
Ozicrypta eungella Raven & Churchill, 1994 – Australia (Queensland)
Ozicrypta filmeri Raven & Churchill, 1994 – Australia (Queensland)
Ozicrypta hollinsae Raven & Churchill, 1994 – Australia (Queensland)
Ozicrypta kroombit Raven & Churchill, 1994 – Australia (Queensland)
Ozicrypta lawlessi Raven & Churchill, 1994 – Australia (Queensland)
Ozicrypta littleorum Raven & Churchill, 1994 – Australia (Queensland)
Ozicrypta mcarthurae Raven & Churchill, 1994 – Australia (Queensland)
Ozicrypta mcdonaldi Raven & Churchill, 1994 – Australia (Queensland)
Ozicrypta microcauda Raven & Churchill, 1994 – Australia (Queensland)
Ozicrypta noonamah Raven & Churchill, 1994 – Australia (Northern Territory)
Ozicrypta palmarum (Hogg, 1901) – Australia (Northern Territory)
Ozicrypta pearni Raven & Churchill, 1994 – Australia (Queensland)
Ozicrypta reticulata (L. Koch, 1874) – Australia (Queensland)
Ozicrypta sinclairi Raven & Churchill, 1994 – Australia (Queensland)
Ozicrypta tuckeri Raven & Churchill, 1994 – Australia (Queensland)
Ozicrypta walkeri Raven & Churchill, 1994 – Australia (Queensland)
Ozicrypta wallacei Raven & Churchill, 1994 – Australia (Queensland)
Ozicrypta wrightae Raven & Churchill, 1994 – Australia (Queensland)

References

Barychelidae
Mygalomorphae genera
Spiders of Australia